Willingford Meadows is a  biological Site of Special Scientific Interest south-west of Burwash in East Sussex.

These species-rich meadows are traditionally managed by grazing and mowing. Grassland types range from calcareous to acid and they are the only unimproved pastures on Jurassic limestone in the county. There is also a stream, a marsh, an area of overgrown hornbeam coppice and a mature hazel and hawthorn hedge.

The meadows are crossed by footpaths.

References

Sites of Special Scientific Interest in East Sussex
Brightling